Prairie Schooners is a 1940 American Western film directed by Sam Nelson, which stars Wild Bill Elliott, Evelyn Young, and Dub Taylor.

Cast list
 Bill Elliott as Wild Bill Hickok
 Evelyn Young as Virginia Benton
 Dub Taylor as Cannonball
 Kenneth Harlan as Dalton Stull
 Ray Teal as Wolf Tanner
 Bob Burns as Jim Gibbs
 Netta Packer as Cora Gibbs
 Richard Fiske as Adams
 Edmund Cobb as Rusty
 Jim Thorpe as Chief Sanche

References

External links
 
 
 

1940 Western (genre) films
1940 films
American Western (genre) films
Films directed by Sam Nelson
American black-and-white films
Cultural depictions of Wild Bill Hickok
1940s American films